Uqi Uqi (Aymara for a species of plant, uqi brown, grey brown, Quechua uqi lead, lead-colored, the reduplication indicates that there is a group or a complex of something, "a complex of grey-brown color" or "a lot of lead", also spelled Oque Oque) is a mountain in the Cordillera Central in the Andes of Peru which reaches a height of approximately . It is located in the Lima Region, Yauyos Province, Laraos District. Uqi Uqi lies northeast of Wamp'una and T'uruyuq.

References 

Mountains of Peru
Mountains of Lima Region